Nido may refer to:

 Nido (brand), a brand of powdered milks

People with the name 
 Alberto A. Nido (1919–1991), American Air Force officer
 Miguel Nido (born 1963), Puerto Rican tennis player
 Tomás Nido (born 1994), Puerto Rican baseball player
 Nido Pavitra, Indian politician
 Nido Qubein (born 1948), American Lebanese-Jordanian businessman and motivational speaker
 Nido Taniam (1990s–2014), Indian student and murder victim

Chemistry 
 Nido cluster, a type of deltahedral atom cluster where one vertex is missing. The descriptor nido- is typically applied boranes, derivatives such as carboranes, and deltahedral metal cluster compounds such as stannides, plumbides and bismuth polycations. The term is usually used in the context of polyhedral skeletal electron pair theory or systematic nomenclature in inorganic chemistry. From the Latin for nest, see :Wiktionary:nido-.

See also 
 El Nido (disambiguation)